The following lists events that happened in 1960 in Iceland.

Incumbents
President – Ásgeir Ásgeirsson
Prime Minister – Ólafur Thors

Events

 11 March 1961 - The Icelandic Althing approved the agreement which expands its territorial waters to 12 nmi (22 km), following the first stage of the territorial dispute with the United Kingdom known as the Cod Wars.

Births

1 June – Einar Vilhjálmsson, javelin thrower
18 July – Guðmundur Steinsson, footballer
30 July – Árni Þór Sigurðsson, ambassador
4 September – Elín Hirst, politician.
16 October – Bjarni Sigurðsson, footballer
13 November – Jón Loftur Árnason, chess grandmaster
8 December – Broddi Kristjansson, badminton player
8 December – Sólveig Anspach, film director and screenwriter (d. 2015)
23 December – Guðmundur Guðmundsson, handball player

References

 
1960s in Iceland
Iceland
Iceland
Years of the 20th century in Iceland